Alfredo Gargiullo (3 April 1906 – 9 March 1928) was an Italian sprinter (400 m).

Biography
Born in Genoa, Gargiullo participated at the 1924 Summer Olympics. He died young at the age of 21 in Milan.

Olympic results

National titles
Alfredo Gargiullo has won 2 times the individual national championship.
2 wins on 400 metres (1924, 1927)

See also
 Italy national relay team

References

External links
 

1906 births
1928 deaths
Italian male sprinters
Athletes (track and field) at the 1924 Summer Olympics
Olympic athletes of Italy
Italian Athletics Championships winners
20th-century Italian people